This is a list of state highways in Rio Grande do Sul, Brazil.

Radial Highways 

  RS-010
  RS-020
  RS-030
  RS-040

North-South Highways 

  RS-110
  RS-115
  RS-118
  RS-122
  RS-124
  RS-126
  RS-128
  RS-129
  RS-130
  RS-132
  RS-135
  RS-137
  RS-142
  RS-143
  RS-149
  RS-150
  RS-155
  RS-162
  RS-165
  RS-168
  RS-176
  RS-183

East-West Highways 

  RS-207
  RS-208
  RS-210
  RS-211
  RS-218
  RS-223
  RS-230
  RS-235
  RS-239
  RS-240
  RS-241
  RS-242
  RS-244
  RS-265

Diagonal highways 

  RS-305
  RS-307
  RS-315
  RS-317
  RS-323
  RS-324
  RS-325
  RS-330
  RS-331
  RS-332
  RS-342
  RS-343
  RS-344
  RS-347
  RS-348
  RS-350
  RS-354
  RS-355
  RS-357
  RS-359
  RS-373
  RS-389

Linking Highways 

  RS-400
  RS-401
  RS-402
  RS-403
  RS-404
  RS-405
  RS-406
  RS-407
  RS-409
  RS-410
  RS-411
  RS-412
  RS-413
  RS-415
  RS-416
  RS-417
  RS-418
  RS-419
  RS-420
  RS-421
  RS-422
  RS-423
  RS-424
  RS-425
  RS-426
  RS-427
  RS-428
  RS-430
  RS-431
  RS-432
  RS-433
  RS-434
  RS-435
  RS-436
  RS-437
  RS-438
  RS-439
  RS-440
  RS-441
  RS-442
  RS-444
  RS-445
  RS-446
  RS-447
  RS-448
  RS-450
  RS-451
  RS-452
  RS-456
  RS-457
  RS-458
  RS-460
  RS-461
  RS-462
  RS-463
  RS-464
  RS-465
  RS-466
  RS-467
  RS-469
  RS-474
  RS-475
  RS-476
  RS-477
  RS-478
  RS-482
  RS-483
  RS-484
  RS-486
  RS-487
  RS-491
  RS-492
  RS-494
  RS-500
  RS-502
  RS-504
  RS-505
  RS-506
  RS-507
  RS-508
  RS-509
  RS-510
  RS-511
  RS-512
  RS-514
  RS-516
  RS-518
  RS-520
  RS-522
  RS-524
  RS-525
  RS-526
  RS-527
  RS-528
  RS-529
  RS-531
  RS-532
  RS-533
  RS-536
  RS-539
  RS-540
  RS-541
  RS-542
  RS-550
  RS-551
  RS-553
  RS-561
  RS-566
  RS-569
  RS-571
  RS-573
  RS-575
  RS-585
  RS-587
  RS-591
  RS-596
  RS-602
  RS-608
  RS-625
  RS-630
  RS-634
  RS-640
  RS-647
  RS-654
  RS-655
  RS-699
  RS-702
  RS-703
  RS-704
  RS-705
  RS-706
  RS-709
  RS-711
  RS-713
  RS-715
  RS-717
  RS-734
  RS-737
  RS-762
  RS-776
  RS-784
  RS-786

Secondary Highways 

 RS-801
 RS-802
 RS-803
 RS-804
 RS-805
 RS-806
 RS-807
 RS-808
 RS-809
 RS-810
 RS-811
 RS-812
 RS-813
 RS-814
 RS-815
 RS-816
 RS-817
 RS-818
 RS-819
 RS-820
 RS-822
 RS-823
 RS-824
 RS-825
 RS-826
 RS-827
 RS-828
 RS-829
 RS-830
 RS-831
 RS-832
 RS-833
 RS-834
 RS-835
 RS-836
 RS-837
 RS-838
 RS-839
 RS-840
 RS-841
 RS-842
 RS-843
 RS-845
 RS-847
 RS-848
 RS-849
 RS-850
 RS-851
 RS-853
 RS-854
 RS-855
 RS-856
 RS-858
 RS-862
 RS-863
 RS-864
 RS-865
 RS-867
 RS-868
 RS-871
 RS-873
 RS-874
 RS-875

See also 
Rio Grande do Sul
Brazilian Highway System
List of highways in Brazil

References

Highways in Rio Grande do Sul
Brazil transport-related lists